Ellen Stewart (1919–2011) was an American theatre director and producer.

Ellen Stewart may also refer to:
Dame Adrienne Stewart, full name Ellen Adrienne Stewart (born 1936), major patron of the arts in Christchurch, New Zealand
Ellen Lowell, formerly Ellen Stewart, a fictional character in the soap opera As the World Turns